Hiltunen is a Finnish surname. Notable people with the surname include:

 Eila Hiltunen (1922–2003), Finnish sculptor
 Jukka Hiltunen (born 1955), Finnish actor
 Onni Hiltunen (1895–1971), Finnish politician
 Petri Hiltunen (born 1967), Finnish cartoonist and illustrator

Finnish-language surnames
Surnames from given names